Olszyniec may refer to the following places in Poland:
Olszyniec, Lower Silesian Voivodeship (south-west Poland)
Olszyniec, Lubusz Voivodeship (west Poland)